The Good Life is the fourth studio album from Christian rap artist Trip Lee. The album was released in 2012, through Reach Records. The album includes features from Lecrae, Andy Mineo, KB, and Jimmy Needham, among others. Four singles were released for the album, "One Sixteen (featuring Andy Mineo and KB)", "I'm Good (featuring Lecrae)", "Fallin' (featuring  J. Paul)", and "Robot". Three promotional music videos were released for the album for three of the four singles, "I'm Good", "Fallin", and "One Sixteen". It was released to critical acclaim, with critics praising Trip's flow, pop-style hooks, high-quality beats, moody electronics, and lyricism.

Album concept

The album artwork shows Lee's face with a distinct orange line through it, signifying that he is "no longer a robot". The overall theme of "no longer being a robot" follows suit in all of the songs on the album, sending a message of freedom from sin through the gospel and not conforming to the ways of this world. It takes its idea from Romans 12:2, which reads, "Do not conform to the pattern of this world, but be transformed by the renewing of your mind. Then you will be able to test and approve what God's will is—his good, pleasing and perfect will". Lee wanted to explore and redefine "The Good Life," arguing that "though the world, the flesh, and the devil lie to us about what the good life is, we don't have to be controlled by those lies. We don't have to be robots. We can choose life." Lee wanted to "challenge the lies we've been told, and present a more glorious picture." It directly challenges and addresses such hot button issues like abortion, lust, the love of money, and excessive consumerism. Overall, Lee wanted to "point his listeners to the grace found in the gospel".

Sales
The Good Life debuted at No. 17 on the Billboard 200 with first-week sales of over 22,000 units, making it the sixth-highest charting Christian Hip Hop Album of all-time (tied with Tedashii's Below Paradise).

Book and further promotional material
To further elaborate on his ideas, on September 20, 2012 Lee wrote and released a book with the same title to accompany the album. It has a foreword by Matt Chandler. To accompany the book, Lee released a remix of "Robot", and "I'm Good," as well as a new song, "Tell It".

Track listing

References

2012 albums
Trip Lee albums
Reach Records albums
Albums produced by Swoope
Albums produced by Gawvi